Sosnovo is a rural  locality (a logging depot settlement) in Priozersky District of Leningrad Oblast, Russia, located on the Karelian Isthmus, and an important railway station of the Saint Petersburg-Kuznechnoye railroad. Population: 7,209 (2010 Census); 5,953 (2002 Census).

History
It was established in 1500 by name of Rautu in Finland. The Battle of Rautu was one of the major battles of the 1918 Finnish Civil War. Population of Rautu was Finnish and mostly Lutheran until the Winter War 1939-1940. The Finnish population was evacuated, and the settlement  finally ceded to the Soviet Union after Continuation War in 1944. The historical name Rautu was changed to the Russian Sosnovo in 1948, as with most historical names of the ceded Finnish Karelian isthmus.

Before the Winter War (1939–1940) and the Continuation War (1941–1944), it was the administrative center of the Rautu municipality of Viipuri Province of Finland. Finnish Rautu had population 5909 in 1939.

Prize-winning Russian folklore ensemble Leznaya Skazka is located in Sosnovo.

References

Rural localities in Leningrad Oblast
Former municipalities of Finland
Karelian Isthmus

fi:Rautu (Käkisalmen piiri)